Amoedo or Amoêdo is a surname. Notable people with the surname include:

Claudio Amoedo (1830-1871), Argentine physician
Felipe Amoedo (1828-1900), Argentine politician
Guillermo Amoedo (born 1983), Uruguayan film director and screenwriter
João Amoêdo (born 1962), Brazilian banker, engineer and company administrator
Rodolfo Amoedo (1857–1941), Brazilian painter, designer and decorator
Sinforoso Amoedo (1823–1871), Argentine physician